Geraint Davies may refer to:

 Geraint Davies (Labour politician) (born 1960), incumbent British Labour-Cooperative Member of Parliament for Swansea West; former British Labour Member of Parliament for Croydon Central
 Geraint Davies (Plaid Cymru politician) (born 1948), Plaid Cymru former member of the Welsh Assembly
 Geraint Davies (rugby league) (born 1986), Welsh rugby league footballer
 Geraint Talfan Davies (born 1943), chairman of the Institute of Welsh Affairs and former Controller of BBC Wales
 Geraint Wyn Davies (born 1957), Welsh-American actor

See also 
Geraint
Geraint (given name)